Enteromius collarti is a species of ray-finned fish in the genus Enteromius which is only found in Angola.

The fish is named in honor of entomologist Albert Collart (1899-1993), who collected the type specimen.

Footnotes 

 

Enteromius
Taxa named by Max Poll
Fish described in 1945